Jean-Louis Koszul (January 3, 1921 – January 12, 2018) was a French mathematician, best known for studying geometry and discovering the Koszul complex. He was a second generation member of Bourbaki.

Biography
His Ph.D. thesis, titled Homologie et cohomologie des algèbres de Lie, was written in 1950 under the direction of Henri Cartan.

He lectured at many universities and was appointed in 1963 professor in the Faculty of Science at the University of Grenoble.  He was a member of the French Academy of Sciences.

Koszul was the cousin of the French composer Henri Dutilleux, and the grandchild of the composer Julien Koszul.

Koszul married Denise Reyss-Brion on July 17, 1948. They had three children: Michel, Bertrand, and Anne.

He died on January 12, 2018, at the age of 97, nine days after his 97th birthday.

See also 
 Koszul algebra
 Koszul complex
 Koszul duality
 Koszul cohomology
 Koszul connection
 Koszul-Tate resolution
 Lie algebra cohomology

References

External links 
 
 

1921 births
2018 deaths
20th-century French mathematicians
École Normale Supérieure alumni
French people of Polish descent
Members of the French Academy of Sciences
Nicolas Bourbaki
Scientists from Strasbourg
Academic staff of Grenoble Alpes University